Chirat-l'Église is a commune in the Allier department in Auvergne in central France.

Geography
The river Bouble forms all of the commune's northwestern border and most of its northeastern border.

Population

See also
Communes of the Allier department

References

Communes of Allier
Allier communes articles needing translation from French Wikipedia